Neuhofen an der Ybbs is a municipality in the district of Amstetten in Lower Austria in Austria.

Geography
Neuhofen an der Ybbs lies in the Mostviertel in the hills north of the Hochkogel at the foot of the Kornberg. Despite its name, it does not lie directly on the river Ybbs. About 20 percent of the municipality is forested.

References

External links 

Cities and towns in Amstetten District